Ventnor is a seaside resort and civil parish established in the Victorian era on the southeast coast of the Isle of Wight, England.

Ventnor may also refer to:

 RAF Ventnor
 SS Ventnor
 Ventnor, Queensland
 Ventnor, Randwick
 Ventnor, Victoria

See also
 Ventnor City, New Jersey